Alain Héroux (born May 20, 1964) is a former professional ice hockey left winger.  He was drafted in the first round, 19th overall, by the Montreal Canadiens in the 1982 NHL Entry Draft.  He never played in the National Hockey League, retiring after just one full professional season in the American Hockey League.

His younger brother Yves Héroux played one game in the National Hockey League with the Quebec Nordiques.

Career statistics

Regular season and playoffs

External links

1982 NHL Entry Draft - Alain Héroux

1964 births
Canadian ice hockey left wingers
Chicoutimi Saguenéens (QMJHL) players
Ice hockey people from Quebec
Living people
Montreal Canadiens draft picks
National Hockey League first-round draft picks
Nova Scotia Voyageurs players
People from Terrebonne, Quebec
Sherbrooke Canadiens players